Bartosz Kwolek (born 17 July 1997) is a Polish professional volleyball player. He is a member of the Poland national team, with which he won the 2018 World Championship. At the professional club level, he plays for Aluron CMC Warta Zawiercie.

Career

Clubs
He debuted in the 2016–17 PlusLiga season as a player of AZS Politechnika Warszawska. In February 2018, Kwolek signed a next two–year contract. In 2020, he extended his contract with the club until 2022.

National team
On 12 April 2015 the Polish national U19 team, including Kwolek, won a title of the CEV U19 European Champions. They beat Italy in the final (3–1). He was named the Most Valuable Player of the tournament. He took part in European Youth Olympic Festival with Polish national U19 team. On 1 August 2015 he achieved gold medal (final match with Bulgaria 3–0). On 23 August 2015 Poland achieved first title of U19 World Champion. In the final his team beat hosts – Argentina (3–2). On September 10, 2016 he achieved title of the 2016 CEV U20 European Champion after winning 7 of 7 matches in tournament and beating Ukraine in the final (3–1). Also, Kwolek received individual award for the Best Outside Hitter. On July 2, 2017 Poland U21, including Kwolek, achieved title of U21 World Champion 2017 after beating Cuba in the final (3–0). Kwolek was awarded an individual award for the Best Outside Spiker of the whole tournament. His national team won 47 matches in the row and never lost. The U21 World Champion title ended his time in youth national teams.

On 30 September 2018 Poland achieved its third title of the World Champion. Poland beat Brazil in the final 3–0 and defended the title from 2014.

Honours

Youth national team
 2015  CEV U19 European Championship
 2015  European Youth Olympic Festival
 2015  FIVB U19 World Championship
 2016  CEV U20 European Championship
 2017  FIVB U21 World Championship

Individual awards
 2015: CEV U19 European Championship – Most Valuable Player
 2015: FIVB U19 World Championship – Most Valuable Player
 2016: CEV U20 European Championship – Best Outside Spiker
 2017: FIVB U21 World Championship – Best Outside Spiker

State awards
 2018:  Gold Cross of Merit

References

External links

 
 Player profile at PlusLiga.pl   
 Player profile at Volleybox.net 

1997 births
Living people
Sportspeople from Płock
Polish men's volleyball players
Projekt Warsaw players
Warta Zawiercie players
Outside hitters